Chad Senior (born December 27, 1974) is an American Olympic modern pentathlete.

Early years
Senior grew up in Fort Myers, Florida, and graduated from North Fort Myers High School. During each year at North Fort Myers High School he earned varsity letters in track, cross country and swimming. He was one of the top athletes in southwest Florida and earned many awards and accolades.

Senior graduated from high school in 1993 and went on to attend The George Washington University in Washington, DC, on a full swimming scholarship.  He holds school records for the 1,000 Freestyle with a time of 9:20.20 in 1993, and the 1,650 Freestyle with a time of 15:36.48 in 1997.

Olympic Training
Senior graduated in 1997 and joined the United States Army's Elite Athlete program so that he could train for the Olympics.  He chose to compete in the modern pentathlon. He competed in many international competitions for several years before his Olympic debut.

Achievements
His first major achievement occurred in 1999, when he won the Conseil International du Sport Militaire (CISM) World Championship team event as a member of the U.S. Army team. Also in 1999, he won the first Biathle World Championship (run-swim-run).

 2004 Olympic Games, 13th place
 2000 Olympic Games, 6th place
 2000 Mexico World Cup, 1st
 2000 Modern Pentathlon World Championships, 15th (individual); relay, team event, 1st
 2000  CISM World Championships, 2nd
 1999  Baltic Cup, 1st
 1999  Biathle World Championships, 1st
 1999  CISM World Championships, 1st (team event); 15th (individual)
 1999 National Championships, 3rd
 1998 National Championships, 6th

In 2000, Senior entered the 2000 World Championships ranked Number 1 in the world.  Although his U.S. men's team won two gold medals in relay and team, he finished a disappointing 15th in individual competition. That same year, Senior had first, third and fourth place finishes at World Cup events.

Senior competed in the 2000 Summer Olympics in Sydney and the 2004 Summer Olympics in Athens.  He finished 6th in 2000, and 13th in 2004.

U.S. Air Force
As of 2018, Senior serves as a Lt Col in the U.S. Air Force, specifically a Combat Rescue Officer – a specialist who goes into "austere and non-permissive environments" to save downed air crew members. He is a member of the 920th Rescue Wing and has served two tours in Afghanistan and one in Iraq.

References

 News Story, Florida Weekly
 vol.6 no.1, 920th Rescue Wing, Patrick Air Force Base, Fla., Air Force Reserve Command, January / February 2008
 
 Naples Daily News "Two time Olympian encourages Bonita Springs Middle students to dream big", August 22, 2012

External links
 

1974 births
Living people
Modern pentathletes at the 2000 Summer Olympics
Modern pentathletes at the 2004 Summer Olympics
Olympic modern pentathletes of the United States
American male modern pentathletes
World Modern Pentathlon Championships medalists
Pan American Games medalists in modern pentathlon
Pan American Games silver medalists for the United States
Modern pentathletes at the 2003 Pan American Games
Medalists at the 2003 Pan American Games
U.S. Army World Class Athlete Program
20th-century American people
21st-century American people